Voeltzkow's snake-eyed skink (Cryptoblepharus voeltzkowi) is a species of lizard in the family Scincidae. It is endemic to Madagascar.

References

Cryptoblepharus
Reptiles described in 1918
Taxa named by Richard Sternfeld
Reptiles of Madagascar
Endemic fauna of Madagascar